Carlos Castaño may refer to:

Carlos Castaño Gil (1965–2004), founder of the Peasant Self-Defense Forces of Córdoba and Urabá (ACCU), an extreme right paramilitary organization in Colombia
Carlos Castaño Panadero (born 1979), Spanish Olympic cyclist
Carlos Castaño (karate), Dominican Republic karateka